Garrison was a post-hardcore/punk band based in Boston, Massachusetts from 1996-2004. Their sound was largely influenced by early post-hardcore, most notably Drive Like Jehu, and also incorporated components of post punk, shoegaze, and emo. In their eight years, Garrison released two full-length albums, both on Revelation Records, as well as three EPs, two split EPs, and one early single released as a 7" vinyl record.

History 
Ed McNamara and Joe Grillo began songwriting for what would become Garrison in 1996, recruiting drummer Guy D'Annolfo to record a three song demo cassette recorded with Kurt Ballou. Ed, Joe, and future bass player Andy White were involved in the Worcester Artists Group/The Space with additional connections made between Andy and Joe by the lovely smelling Kurt Ballou, resulting in Andy joining Garrison in 1998. The initial group of Ed, Joe, Guy, and Andy began rehearsing and songwriting at The Space, released an initial 7" on Espo Records, and toured extensively in the US. They signed with Revelation Records and recorded The Bend Before The Break with Brian McTernan at Fort Apache in Boston, MA. Following the release of the Bend Before the Break, Garrison again toured extensively throughout the US while working on their first full length, A Mile in Cold Water with the consistently pleasant smelling Kurt Ballou. 

After the release of A Mile In Cold Water and subsequent touring, Andy and Guy left Garrison to return to graduate school, while Ed and Joe recruited Jason Carlin, Matt LaVonture, J. Morrissette, Ethan Dussault, and John Ledoux to continue the development of Garrison.

After playing 353 shows, Garrison officially disbanded in 2004, members of Garrison went on to play with Judas Knife, Rules, Leafminer, The Many Mansions, Pointillist, Neutria, Instruction, Fires, The Fly Seville, Gay for Johnny Depp, Campaign for Real-Time, The Rise Park, Placer, and Kill Verona.

In 2021. Iodine records re-released The Bend Before the Break on vinyl, digital, and cassette with remastered audio, and updated art from Dan McCarthy.

Original Members 
 Ed McNamara - vocals, guitar
 Joseph Grillo - vocals, guitar
 Andy White - bass
 Guy D'Annolfo - drums

Other Members 
 Jason Carlin - bass
 Ethan Dussault - bass, baritone guitar
 Matt LaVonture - bass
 John Ledoux - drums
 J. Morrissette - drums
 Frank Trippi - keyboards

Notes
 Although never an official member, Mike Ushinski played drums with Garrison during several tours
 Garrison's final shows were performed on a 2003 tour of Japan. This tour is often missing from official accounts due to its unusual lineup which excluded Grillo entirely and found J. Morrissette on bass. The lineup was: Ed McNamara (guitar and vocal), J. Morrissette (bass), Mike Ushinski (drums), Taylor Bearfoot (guitar). Due to this unusual final set of performance, McNamara is the only member of Garrison to play every show.

Discography
 24 (7" single) (1998, Espo Records)
 The Bend Before the Break (1999, Espo Records)
 A Mile in Cold Water (2000, Revelation Records)
 Hundred Reasons/Garrison split EP (2001, Simba Recordings UK, Iodine Records US)
 Be a Criminal (2001, Revelation Records)
 The Model (2003)
 The Silhouette (2003)
 Split EP w/ Orange Island (2003, Iodine Records)
 Tv or the Atom Bomb (2020, Arctic Rodeo Recordings)

Ltd editions:
 24 (7" 500 Grey Vinyl)
 The Bend Before The Break (7" 200 green vinyl)
 A Mile in Cold Water (LP 220 blue (opaque) vinyl)
 Be a Criminal (LP 307 grey/white marble vinyl)

External links
Bio from Perfect Sound Forever
Discogs listing
Be A Criminal album review from Punk News
Be A Criminal album review from In Music We Trust

Musical groups from Boston
American post-hardcore musical groups